ONE Friday Fights 7: Rambolek vs. Theeradet (also known as ONE Lumpinee 7) was a combat sport event produced by ONE Championship that took place on March 3, 2023, at Lumpinee Boxing Stadium in Bangkok, Thailand.

Background
In the event was headlined at preliminary card by a bantamweight muay thai bout between the Yodphupha Tor.Yotha vs. Ilyas Musaev, at the main event in a 143 pounds catchweight muay thai bout between Rambolek Chor.Ajalaboon vs. Theeradet Chor.Hapayak.

Results

Bonus awards 
The following fighters received $10,000 bonuses.

Performance of the Night: Rambolek Chor.Ajalaboon, Samingdam Chor.Ajalaboon and Lisa Brierley

See also 

 2023 in ONE Championship
 List of ONE Championship events
 List of current ONE fighters

References 

Events in Bangkok
ONE Championship events
2023 in mixed martial arts
Mixed martial arts in Thailand
Sports competitions in Thailand
March 2023 sports events in Thailand